Ensemble may refer to:

Art 
 Architectural ensemble
 Ensemble (album), Kendji Girac 2015 album
 Ensemble (band), a project of Olivier Alary
 Ensemble cast (drama, comedy)
 Ensemble (musical theatre), also known as the chorus
 Ensemble (Stockhausen), 1967 group-composition project by Karlheinz Stockhausen
 Musical ensemble

Mathematics and science 
 Distribution ensemble or probability ensemble (cryptography)
 Ensemble Kalman filter
 Ensemble learning (statistics and machine learning)
 Ensembl genome database project
 Neural ensemble, a population of nervous system cells (or cultured neurons) involved in a particular neural computation
 Statistical ensemble (mathematical physics)
 Climate ensemble
 Ensemble average (statistical mechanics)
 Ensemble averaging (machine learning)
 Ensemble (fluid mechanics)
 Ensemble forecasting (meteorology)
 Quantum statistical mechanics, the study of statistical ensembles of quantum mechanical systems

Technology 
 DAB ensemble, a group of Digital Audio Broadcasting broadcasters transmitting multiple digital radio channels on a single radio transmission
 Geoworks Ensemble, a computer operating system.

Companies and organizations 
 Ensemble Studios, a disbanded Microsoft-owned company in the computer and video game industry
 Ensemble Theatre, a theatre company in Australia
 The Ensemble Theatre, a theatre company in Houston, Texas

Politics 
 Ensemble!, a political party in France
 Ensemble Citoyens, a political coalition in France led by La République En Marche!

Events 
 "Ensemble", the annual festival held at Watumull Institute of Electronic Engineering and Computer Technology
 "Ensemble", the annual conference held at XLRI School of Business and Human Resources, India